Entomopteryx combusta is a moth of the family Geometridae first described by Warren in 1893. It is found in Sikkim in India, Sri Lanka, Java, Taiwan, and Japan.

The male's antennae is prismatic. Facies dull yellow, speckled and marked with reddish brown. A strong medial fascia runs through the discal dot in hindwings. Male has narrow forewings. Female has extensively reddish brown forewings.

References

Moths of Asia
Moths described in 1893